Hristo Kochov (born 7 December 1912, date of death unknown) was a Bulgarian cross-country skier who competed in the 1936 Winter Olympics. 

In 1936 he was member of the Bulgarian relay team which finished 15th in the 4x10 km relay competition. In the 18 km event he finished 53rd.

References 

1912 births
Year of death missing
Bulgarian male cross-country skiers
Olympic cross-country skiers of Bulgaria
Cross-country skiers at the 1936 Winter Olympics